Guillermo McFarlane is a retired American soccer defender who played professionally in the USL A-League and National Professional Soccer League.. who began playing soccer at the age of 18. While at The University Of Texas At El Paso (UTEP), McFarlane was an NCCSA first team All American in 1991 and 1994. Also known as La Pantera.

In 1992, McFarlane played for the El Paso Patriots in the USISL.  He  was All League that season.  He also played for El Paso in 1995 and 1996.  In 1995, he was a South Central Division All Star defender.  From 1997 to 2004, McFarlane played 147 games for the Patriots.while with the patriots before the U.S open cup final against the Richmond Kikers , McFarlane was named Top Defender in the USA Today article on August 24 1995.  During those year, the Patriots played in various USISL/USL leagues, including the USISL Select League, USL A-League and USL Premier Development League.  In 1999, McFarlane signed with the Wichita Wings of the National Professional Soccer League, playing two seasons with them. Parents are Guillermo E McFarlane Sr and Patricia Elena Leonard de McFarlane. Siblings are Narcisa Leonard and Irene Vasquez

References

External links
 Soccerstats: Guillermo McFarlane

Living people
1971 births
American soccer players
El Paso Patriots players
National Professional Soccer League (1984–2001) players
A-League (1995–2004) players
USL League Two players
USISL Select League players
USISL players
Wichita Wings players
Association football defenders